Kokolo, also known as the Kokolo Afrobeat Orchestra, is an American Afrobeat band from the Lower East Side of New York City, formed in 2001 by songwriter/producer Ray Lugo.

Along with the Daktaris and Antibalas, they form part of the early New York Afrobeat scene that ignited the genre's current global revival.

Name origin 
The band's name was taken from a 1970s term, "cocolo", that originated in parts of the Caribbean and was later used in New York City's Latin communities, often as a pejorative, to describe non-Hispanic African descendants, many of whom were fans of Afro music. Kokolo aimed to invert the negative connotation of the term through the positivity in their music.

History: From punk to Afrofunk

Fuss and Fight 
Prior to founding Kokolo, Lugo's musical background was rooted in New York's downtown hardcore punk and rock scenes, associating with groups such as Bad Brains, Agnostic Front, Cro-Mags, Gorilla Biscuits, Jawbreaker, Youth of Today, Anthrax, Leeway and Warzone. Warzone's lead singer, Raymond "Raybeez" Barbieri was a close personal friend of Lugo and an early mentor on the ins-and-outs of independent music, inspiring the DIY ethic that would become a key characteristic of Kokolo.

By the summer of 1995, Lugo ran Underhanded Studios, a recording facility on Ludlow Street which he shared with Mark Anthony Thompson from Chocolate Genius, Sim Cain from the Rollins Band and Yuka Honda (Cibo Matto/Sean Lennon) . While at Underhanded, Lugo befriended Bosco Mann and Phillip Lehman, who soon recorded the first albums for Desco Records at Underhanded and who would go on to release the Daktaris album, which spearheaded the Afrobeat revival in New York. Also during this time, while producing King Chango's debut recordings, Lugo recruited Martin Perna and Mike Wagner as the group's horn section. Perna and Wagner would go on to form Antibalas, along with percussionist Fernando Velez (Sharon Jones & The Dap-Kings), another former King Chango alumni.

Lugo's search for a new musical direction let him to form Kokolo in the spring of 2001, enthused by the template of his friends in Antibalas and informed by the music of Fela Kuti, James Brown and the Fania All-Stars and by the live power of groups like Bad Brains, The Clash and Mano Negra.

Initially a traditional Afrobeat ensemble, the group consisted of 14 members from various parts of the world, and as a result of a revolving door of musicians coming in and out of the group, the initial months proved frustrating at tightening up the group as a live unit. During this time Lugo met English Trombonist Chris Morrow, the only other original member currently in the group.

In the summer of 2001, Lugo turned to Gabe Roth to produce Kokolo's debut album "Fuss And Fight", so called because Lugo wanted to denote the friction and internal bickering going on within the group at that time. Recorded at Daptone Studios in Brooklyn, featuring some of the musicians in Antibalas and released on the UK Label AfroKings, "Fuss And Fight" quickly gained the band a following, in particular with European audiences, due in part to the relative novelty of the genre, but also due to their high-energy performances and undeniable talent, and the band soon toured the UK for the first time. Prior to this maiden tour and a result of internal disagreements, most of the initial group left to form the Akoya Afrobeat Ensemble.

Finding themselves stuck with an upcoming tour and no band, Roth came to the rescue by connecting Lugo and Morrow with longtime collaborator and former Fela Kuti/Manu DiBango drummer Jojo Kuo, enabling them to carry on with the tour.

More Consideration 
Initially panned by critics, "Fuss And Fight" drew its share of negative, or at the very least, suspicious, press upon its release. Long accustomed to Fela-esque prototypes, purists found the group's radical take on Afrobeat not to their liking. Although initially stung by the lukewarm response, Lugo quickly set off to write Kokolo's second album during a stay in Amsterdam in 2003, noting only the criticisms from a selected number of writers whose opinion he respected, more inspired than ever to solidify an original sound for the group.

The result was the critically acclaimed More Consideration, which featured more complex orchestrations and sophisticated compositions. The album benefited from the participation of players such as Charlie Hunter, Gabe Roth (Sharon Jones & The Dap-Kings), Mike Weitman (Project Logic) and Jojo Kuo (Fela Kuti/Manu DiBango), and was released by London taste-maker Adrian Gibson's Freestyle Records imprint in 2004.

The enthusiastic response to More Consideration allowed the band to reach a broader audience and to perform on some of the world's premier stages, from the main stage of The Montreal International Jazz Festival, Glastonbury Festival and scores of others around the world, where they shared the spotlight with acts ranging from Roots Manuva, Manu DiBango, Taj Mahal, Isaac Hayes, Zap Mama and Gilles Peterson to Chic, Pete Rock, The Itals, Bloodhound Gang, Roy Ayers and Seun Kuti and Egypt 80.

Also during this time, the group began to experiment with remixes of their original songs, something which some found somewhat taboo, but was viewed by the band as another vehicle with which to reach listeners. To date Kokolo has been remixed by Faze Action, BeatFanatic, Lack Of Afro, Diesler and many others.

Love International 
Kokolo's third album, "Love International" continued to expand the group's sound as Lugo incorporated elements of Hip Hop, Dancehall and a more pronounced Latin influence throughout the songs. The group's "Afro" version of The Clash's "The Magnificent Seven", a nod to one of Lugo's musical heroes, was well received by DJ's around the world and featured Jamaican dancehall artist Joe Daddz on lead vocals.

"Love International", released in July 2007 on Freestyle Records, confirmed that Kokolo possessed "Our Own Thing", as one of the album's more driving songs proclaimed, and helped the band tour a number of new countries as a result, and were the first group to bring live Afrobeat music to countries such as Lithuania, Latvia, Estonia, Bulgaria and Romania, among others.

Heavy Hustling 
The band's fourth studio album, "Heavy Hustling", found them meshing Fela Kuti poly-rhythms and Fania All-Star cadence into a number of James Brown classics, with Lugo providing original vocals, turning classics like "Soul Power" into tongue-in-cheek come ons through lyrical plays on sexual themes and a marked emphasis on West-African Afrofunk.

"I thought it would be interesting to make explicit the implicit connection that exists between Nigerian Afrobeat and American Funk and explore the musical dialogue that took place across the Atlantic during that golden era, a dialogue that also included the New York Latin sound, which was also highly regarded and influential in Africa at the time", states Lugo.

"Heavy Hustling" was released on the Milan-based Record Kicks label in February 2009 and the band soon followed its release with its most extensive tour schedule to date.

100 Fevers 
Kokolo continued to further expand their sound via the group's fifth studio album, "100 Fevers", released in January 2017. The work featured songs influenced by Afrodisco, contemporary club rhythms and West-African Afrofunk.

In 2017, German Hip-Hop supergroup Fünf Sterne deluxe featured a sample of Kokolo's "The Way Up" on a song and video titled "Afrokalle", from the band's album, "Flash".

"Kokolo vs.Terricos", a vinyl EP of remixes of music by both groups was released in November 2018 on American label Peace & Rhythm.

Style and influences 
Originally formed as a traditional Afrobeat ensemble, Kokolo quickly developed a far spikier sound, often played faster and more emphatically than many of their contemporaries. They have also proven adept at broadening their sound by incorporating influences from a variety of other genres. Although Kokolo sing in English primarily, they have released several numbers sung in Spanish and Portuguese.

Lugo's songwriting approach is largely informed by punk, rock and reggae, and contrary to many contemporary Afrobeat groups' reliance on more "Jazzy" instrumentals, Kokolo's songs feature re-occurring vocal choruses, which are designed to engage and energize audiences at live shows.

Their live performances also vary drastically from that of their peers, as Kokolo's shows are more frenzied and akin to rock concerts, another indication of the influence of groups like Bad Brains and Mano Negra on the group.

Since forming, they have evolved into a prolific recording machine, with over 50 releases on their discography and features in scores of notable international compilations, alongside artists like Femi Kuti, Ska Cubano, Tony Allen, U-Roy, Caetano Veloso, Masters At Work, Quantic, Salif Keita, Gerardo Frisina, Baaba Maal, Jazztronik, Zero 7, Afro Celt Sound System, Joe Bataan, Common, The Orb, Eric B & Rakim and many more.

Kokolo are also notable as practitioners of the Simple Living lifestyle, and followers of the writings of J. Krishnamurti, whose concepts heavily influenced the lyrics on the band's second album, "More Consideration", as exemplified by the maxim found on their album jackets: "Live More, Consume Less.. With More Joy and Less Stress". They have donated songs, performed and raised funds on behalf of scores of projects ranging from Youth empowerment organizations to AIDS relief groups and environmental causes.

Discography

Albums

12" singles | EPs

7" singles

Compilations featuring Kokolo

References

External links 
 Official Band Website
 KOKOLO on Facebook
 KOKOLO on YouTube

Spanish-language singers of the United States
Portuguese-language singers of the United States
Afro-beat musical groups
Musical groups from New York City
American world music groups
Musical groups established in 2001
2001 establishments in New York City